The Freedom Union (UW) was a liberal democratic political party in Poland.

History 

It was founded on 20 March 1994 out of the merger of the Democratic Union (Unia Demokratyczna, UD) and the Liberal Democratic Congress (Kongres Liberalno-Demokratyczny, KLD).  Both of these parties had roots in the Solidarity trade union movement.  It represented European democratic and liberal tradition, i.e., it advocated free market economy and individual liberty, rejected extremism and fanaticism, favoured European integration (in the form of European Union membership), rapid privatisation of the enterprises still owned by the Polish state and decentralisation of the government.

In the 1991 general elections, the KLD received 7.5% of the vote and 37 seats in the Sejm (out of 460 seats) and the UD got 12.3% of the votes and 62 seats. In 1993 the KLD got 4.0% of the votes and was left without seats; the UD got 10.6% of the votes and 74 seats. In 1997 the UW got 13.4% of the votes and 60 seats.

In January 2001 some members of the FU decided to move to join the new Civic Platform (Platforma Obywatelska), which got 12.7% of the votes and 65 seats in the September 2001 general elections whilst the FU failed to cross the 5% threshold required to gain entry to the lower house of Parliament, receiving only 3.1%. Surprisingly, the FU managed to cross the required 5% threshold in the 2004 European Parliament elections, receiving 7% of votes and 4 of 54 seats reserved for Poland in the European Parliament as part of the European Liberal Democrat and Reform Party, of which it was a member.

The initiative by the FU leadership to found the centre/social-liberal Democratic Party (Partia Demokratyczna – demokraci.pl) attracted a lot of attention. It was cofounded by Władysław Frasyniuk and economy minister Jerzy Hausner, joined by prime minister Marek Belka. Former FU member Tadeusz Mazowiecki also joined the initiative. Legally the centrist Democratic Party, founded 9 May 2005, is the successor of the FU.

Election results

Sejm

Senate

Presidential

Regional assemblies

European Parliament

Former leader
 Władysław Frasyniuk – Party chairman

Members of Polish Parliament (Sejm)
 None since 2001

Former Members of Polish Senate
 Olga Teresa Krzyżanowska – caucus vice-chairperson
 Dorota Simonides
 Kazimierz Kutz
 Andrzej Jan Wielowieyski – caucus chairman
 Grażyna Staniszewska (until 13 June 2004, elected to the European Parliament)

Members of the European Parliament of the former Freedom Union
 Bronisław Geremek, historian and politician, ex-minister of foreign affairs
 Jan Kułakowski, journalist, ex-Poland-EU negotiator
 Janusz Onyszkiewicz, mathematician and politician, vice-president of the European Parliament
 Grażyna Staniszewska, politician, senator

Other prominent members
 Jan Rokita – now Civic Platform
 Donald Tusk – now Civic Platform
 Janusz Lewandowski – now Civic Platform
 Jacek Kuroń – died 17 June 2004

See also
 Liberalism in Poland
 Liberalism
 Contributions to liberal theory
 Liberalism worldwide
 List of liberal parties
 Liberal democracy

References

1994 establishments in Poland
2005 disestablishments in Poland
Centrist parties in Poland
Christian democratic parties in Europe
Defunct liberal political parties
Defunct political parties in Poland
International Republican Institute
Liberal parties in Poland
Political parties disestablished in 2005
Political parties established in 1994
Social liberal parties